Edson René Braafheid (born 8 April 1983) is a Dutch footballer who currently plays as a left-back for amateur club Palm Beach Stars.

Braafheid started  his career with Eredivisie side Utrecht in 2003, before moving on to FC Twente in 2007 on a free transfer. He was signed by German Bundesliga club Bayern Munich in 2009 for €2 million. After failing to break into the team during the first half of the season Braafheid moved on loan to Scottish Premier League club Celtic, in order to increase his chances of playing in the 2010 FIFA World Cup with Holland. After a few appearances at the start of the 2011–12 season for Bayern, Braafheid moved to fellow Bundesliga club Hoffenheim.

Braafheid has played for the U-21 and full Netherlands team. Braafheid was called up to the Netherlands  squad for the 2008 Summer Olympics, however, due to Twente's European matches early in the season he couldn't go. He was also called up to the squad for the 2010 World Cup and made a substitute appearance in the final.

Club career

Utrecht
Braafheid began his professional career at FC Utrecht in 2003 and made 81 appearances for the side.

FC Twente
On 10 February 2007, Braafheid played his first Eredivisie match for FC Twente against Feyenoord. His current contract at the club lasts until 2010.

Braafheid came to Twente on a free transfer after his contract with Utrecht expired; he was a talented left-back, but Braafheid impressed friend and foe when playing for Twente as a strong, sturdy central defender instead of his former position. He kept talented central defender Ramon Zomer out of the Twente squad ever since he made the position his own. Former Twente coach Fred Rutten is to thank for that, turning Braafheid from a noticeably talented back to an impressive central defender, despite his mediate height.

Bayern Munich
Braafheid joined Bayern Munich for the 2009–10 season after the German club and Twente agreed on a €2 million transfer deal on 11 June 2009. He was not able to secure himself a place in the starting squad, however, during the first half of the season, he asked for a transfer in order to have a chance of being nominated for the Dutch 2010 World Cup team.

Celtic
Braafheid was signed by Celtic of Scotland on a loan deal until the end of the 2009–10 season on 1 February.

Braafheid made his debut for Celtic on 7 February 2010 in a 4–2 victory over Dunfermline Athletic in the Scottish Cup. He failed to make an impression afterwards, and played in several draws and defeats in crucial games for Celtic. He was finally dropped from the first team following the sacking of Tony Mowbray on 25 March 2010.

1899 Hoffenheim
After Braafheid made only three appearances in the first leg of the new season, he moved to fellow Bundesliga side 1899 Hoffenheim on 27 January, following teammate David Alaba. On 5 February 2011, Braafheid made his debut for the team in the 3–2 home win against 1. FC Kaiserslautern, but was sent off only six minutes after coming on as a substitute for Vedad Ibišević.

Returning from a one-season loan spell at FC Twente and despite his contract running until June 2014, Braafheid was no longer part of Hoffenheim's Bundesliga squad for the 2013-14 campaign. His former shirt number 28 was assigned to Alexander Stolz. After the summer transfer window had closed, he started to participate in the U23 training sessions.

S.S. Lazio
On 1 August 2014, S.S. Lazio announced that they had signed Braafheid on a free transfer. He renewed contract on 6 July 2015.

FC Utrecht
On 17 August 2016, Braafheid signed a one-year contract at his first club FC Utrecht. In early January 2018, he agreed the termination of his contract with Utrecht citing family reasons and lack of playing time.

Austin Bold FC
In August 2018, Braafheid was one of the first three players signed by USL Championship expansion club Austin Bold FC, along with Kléber Freitas and Marcelo Saragosa. Braafheid's work visa cleared in June 2019 and he made his debut for Bold FC on June 30, playing the full 90 in a 5-0 win over Colorado Springs Switchbacks FC.

Palm Beach Stars
Braafheid continued his career by joining the Palm Beach Stars of the Florida-based Premier American Soccer League in November 2020.

International career

In 2006, Braafheid was part of the Netherlands squad that won the UEFA U-21 Championship 2006 in Portugal.

In a column in early 2008, critic Hugo Borst had named Braafheid as a true defender, and stated he should have been in the Dutch squad for Euro 2008 in Austria and Switzerland under manager Marco van Basten. Dutch fans heavily criticised the defence after Jaap Stam, Frank de Boer, and other highly rated defenders said goodbye to the Oranje shirt. Even despite the defenders since then continued to concede very few goals in the post-Stam era, defence was considered as the greatest weakness. On 11 February 2009, Braafheid made his debut for the Dutch national team against Tunisia.

2008 Summer Olympics
In early summer of 2008, Braafheid was selected for the Dutch Olympic Squad going to Beijing, along with fellow Twente defender Rob Wielaert, as one of the three possible dispensation players. But as Twente qualified for UEFA Champions League football in play-offs by beating Ajax, Braafheid and Wielaert were no longer allowed to go, as their Champions League matches were early in the season.

2010 World Cup
Braafheid was included in the preliminary squad for the 2010 FIFA World Cup in South Africa. On 27 May 2010, Netherlands manager Bert van Marwijk announced that the player would be part of the final squad of 23 competing in South Africa. Braafheid came on as a substitute in the World Cup final. Near the end of the second half of extra time he was hit in the back of his head by an accidental volley. Luckily, the ball fell right into the arms of the Dutch keeper Maarten Stekelenburg. The Netherlands went on to lose the match, thus making them the runners up for a third time in a World Cup final. Braafheid and the rest of his team were rewarded with a silver medal.

Career statistics

Club

Honours
Utrecht
Johan Cruyff Shield: 2004

Netherlands
FIFA World Cup runner-up: 2010

References

External links

Profile at VI.nl 

1983 births
Living people
Sportspeople from Paramaribo
Dutch footballers
Netherlands international footballers
Netherlands under-21 international footballers
Surinamese footballers
Surinamese emigrants to the Netherlands
Dutch expatriate footballers
FC Utrecht players
FC Twente players
FC Bayern Munich footballers
Celtic F.C. players
TSG 1899 Hoffenheim players
S.S. Lazio players
Eredivisie players
Bundesliga players
Scottish Premier League players
Serie A players
Expatriate footballers in Germany
Expatriate footballers in Scotland
Expatriate footballers in Italy
Dutch expatriate sportspeople in Germany
Dutch expatriate sportspeople in Scotland
Dutch expatriate sportspeople in Italy
2010 FIFA World Cup players
Association football fullbacks
Austin Bold FC players
USL Championship players